Givology.org is an online giving marketplace through which any Internet user can browse and sponsor students and education projects in the developing world. Founded in 2008 by undergraduate students at the University of Pennsylvania, Givology currently has 501(c)3 tax-exempt status. It is the first education crowdfunding platform.

Internet Microphilanthropy and Online Giving Marketplaces

With technological advances reducing transaction costs and increasing usage of P2P (peer-to-peer) social networking sites, many have claimed that the Internet has fundamentally revolutionized philanthropy, empowering information sharing to make giving by individuals much more targeted, transparent, and rewarding. Internet-philanthropy creates a new channel for giving money. Some frequently cited examples include Kiva.org in microfinance, GlobalGiving in general philanthropy, and Mission Fish on eBay in fundraising.

These online giving marketplaces typically emphasize donor choice, transparency, small-dollar transactions, and the free-flow of information. As a form of strategic giving, Internet microphilanthropy communities depend on their credibility with partners – since transactions are cast as 1:1 interactions between donor/lender and NGO/entrepreneur, Internet microphilanthropy sites face the challenge of ensuring that the money they raise will indeed be spent in its purported manner.   The danger of false transparency looms, however, as earmarked funds raised for a partner organization may often be channeled into general use. Furthermore, the use of entrepreneur or student profiles can be misleading, as money often flows to a host organization that works with these individuals instead of directly to the individual listed on such websites.

How Givology Works

Givology partners with grassroots education organizations in China, Uganda, Mexico, Sri Lanka, Colombia, Argentina, Afghanistan, Haiti, Liberia, Mali, Pakistan, Peru, Brazil, Paraguay, Ghana, Senegal, Guatemala, Tanzania, Benin, Vietnam, Rwanda, India, Kenya and Ecuador. Partners are generally local charities that lack the marketing resources of larger organizations and are not familiar with using the Internet for fundraising and awareness-building. Once a partnership is approved, Givology posts projects and student information on its website to begin the fundraising process. Funding requests must be no more than US$500, and all partner organizations must give a detailed breakdown of the usage of funds provided by Givology donors.

Donors add money to their Givology account via Google Checkout. After browsing student and project profiles, donors allocate funds from their Givology wallets to students and projects of their choice. Through the website's messaging function, donors can send a message to the student or project leader asking for a progress update and confirmation of the receipt of funds, or just providing a general letter of support. Givology downloads all donor messages and sends them to the student or project beneficiaries with the aim of facilitating cross-cultural communication and dialogue.

Once a student or project is fully funded, Givology sends a check to the partner organization, which is responsible for delivering the funds to the student or the project beneficiaries.  The partner organization must provide regular updates, which can be in the form of videos, photos, letters from students, and/or academic transcripts. Givology staff then posts updates online for donors to view, aiming to promote transparency.

Because Givology is run completely by volunteers, 100% of the funds that it raises goes to the partner organizations. Besides helping partner organizations raise money for a student or project, Givology assists the organizations with impact evaluation studies, volunteer recruitment, and marketing campaigns.

Team

Givology was founded by a team of undergraduates at the University of Pennsylvania in March 2008. Since then, Givology's team has expanded to include undergraduate and graduate students at Virginia Tech, Columbia University, the University of Southern California, and the University of Pennsylvania, several high school students from across the United States, as well as young professionals in marketing and finance. Givology's board of directors includes professionals in academia, finance, philanthropy, law, and education entrepreneurship.

Partner Organizations and Due Diligence

Givology depends heavily upon its partner organizations to operate. According to the Givology website, partnerships are secured only after a vigorous due diligence process that involves formal documentation, site visits, and interviews. Nevertheless, Givology is still completely dependent upon its partner organizations to deliver the level of transparency it promises. Some of Givology's field partners include Asha for Education, Rural China Education Foundation, the Peach Foundation, and the Peace Primary School located outside Kampala, Uganda.

Fellows Program

Givology fellows travel throughout the world, visiting rural villages, schools, or project sites sponsored by Givology. Acting as the eyes and ears of donors, fellows provide photos, videos, and commentary to supplement the project and student updates. Fellows describe education interventions that work, along with initiatives that have failed to meet objectives. Transparency and critical analysis are the main objectives. Fellows post regularly to the Givology Fellows Blog.

Campus Chapters

Givology campus chapters have been established at several universities, including the University of Pennsylvania, Oxford University, Virginia Tech and Peking University. Chapters and teams raise money, hold local fundraising events, and help identify new potential partnerships.

A Guide to Giving

Givology published its first book, A Guide to Giving, on January 21, 2013, which is available on Amazon.com as a Kindle Edition. The book was written collectively by Givology volunteers, and it explores effective giving, including the topics of different social enterprise practices, how to measure "return on giving" and how to optimize volunteer engagement.  The second part of the book features the stories of 12 social entrepreneurs including Do Something, Circle of Peace School, and Tanzanian Children's Fund.

Publicity

Givology has been featured in New York Times columnist Nicholas Kristof’s blog “On the Ground” as well as his book "Half the Sky", Knowledge @ Wharton, the Daily Pennsylvanian, Social Edge, Idealist.org, City Weekend, Huffington Post, MTV Act and several local newspapers. In addition, Givology founders have presented at the New York Women Social Entrepreneurs’ Conference and the Oxford Forum for International Development.

Statistics

Givology publishes its weekly impact and total impact on the front page of its website. As of May 18, 2013 Givology has raised $315,930 in 1,814 donations to 190 students and 57 projects, which has helped over 2,800 students. Givology has 3,793 total donors registered.

Criticism

Givology, as well as several similar sites, uses student profiles to create an appearance of direct donations to individuals. Since funds are mediated through partner organizations, it is impossible to determine whether partner organizations simply redirect funds they would otherwise spend on a donation recipient on other projects after receiving an online donation through such websites. It would be more accurate to characterize such sites as donating to other non-profit organizations that help fund students.

Online giving marketplaces often struggle to balance the competing obligations of providing granular information about schools and students to satisfy the donor and protecting the identity of students. Ample student information is provided on Givology. In addition, information is stored about different donors and their giving history on Givology. Thus, protecting all the stakeholders who participate in Givology should be a central concern, as credibility can easily be lost with a security breach.

Another criticism is on Givology's requirements for their partner organizations to have access to technology in order to provide regular updates and communication, but often, some of the most innovative grassroots work is conducted by organizations lacking these resources. Hence, all Internet microphilanthropy sites risk the possibility of linking and supporting a subset of more privileged organizations and schools who do meet the baseline requisite for technology.

References

External links
Givology.org
Givology in Knowledge @ Wharton
Givology in the Vienna Connection

International development agencies